Cleptometopus mniszechii is a species of beetle in the family Cerambycidae. It was described by Lacordaire in 1872.

References

mniszechii
Beetles described in 1872